A computer is a programmable machine that can perform arithmetic and logical operations.

Computer may also refer to:
 Computer (Courage the Cowardly Dog), a character in the American animated television series
 Computer (magazine), a magazine published by the Institute of Electrical and Electronics Engineers
 Computer (occupation)
 Analog computer
 OK Computer, a 1997 Radiohead album
 Personal computer (PC)
 The Computer (or Friend Computer), a character in the role-playing game Paranoia
 Enock Mwepu (born 1998), Gambian retired professional footballer. Nicknamed 'The Computer' for his ability to read the game.